The 1948 Drake Bulldogs football team was an American football team that represented Drake University as a member of the Missouri Valley Conference during the 1948 college football season. In its second season under head coach Albert Kawal, the team compiled a 7–3 record (1–1 against MVC opponents), finished third in the conference, defeated Arizona in the 1949 Salad Bowl, and outscored all opponents by a total of 199 to 105. The team played its home games at Drake Stadium in Des Moines, Iowa.

Schedule

References

Drake
Drake Bulldogs football seasons
Salad Bowl champion seasons
Drake Bulldogs football